Graceham is an unincorporated community and a census-designated place (CDP) in Frederick County, Maryland, United States. Graceham is home to Graceham Moravian Church and Parsonage. Per the 2020 Census, the population was 243.

Demographics

2020 census

Note: the US Census treats Hispanic/Latino as an ethnic category. This table excludes Latinos from the racial categories and assigns them to a separate category. Hispanics/Latinos can be of any race.

References

External links

Census-designated places in Frederick County, Maryland
Census-designated places in Maryland